Sidney is an unincorporated community located in the Municipality of North Norfolk in south central Manitoba, Canada.

References 

Unincorporated communities in Manitoba